Sami Potta Mudichu is a 1991 Indian Tamil-language drama film film, written and directed by R. Sundarrajan. The film stars Murali and Sindhu. It was released on 11 January 1991, and became a success.

Plot 

Kathirvelan's goal in life is to take revenge on his uncle, who had killed his grandfather. However, he has a change of heart after meeting his uncle's daughter, Neelaveni.

Cast 
 Murali as Kathirvelan
 Sindhu as Neelaveni
 R. Sundarrajan
 M. N. Nambiar
 Disco Shanti
 Thalapathi Dinesh
 Pandu
 Vinu Chakravarthy
 Vennira Aadai Moorthy

Soundtrack 
Soundtrack was composed by Ilaiyaraaja. The lyrics were written by Gangai Amaran and Vaali. The songs "Neelaveni" and "Madhulankaniye" attained popularity.

References

External links 
 
 

1990s Tamil-language films
1991 drama films
1991 films
Films directed by R. Sundarrajan
Films scored by Ilaiyaraaja
Indian drama films
Indian films about revenge